Maria Tekla Famiglietti  (1936–2020) was an Italian Catholic religious sister who served as the abbess general of the Order of the Most Holy Savior, commonly called the Bridgettine Sisters, beginning in 1981. On 28 October 2016, Famiglietti retired and was replaced by Fabia Kattakayam.

Life
Born 23 December 1936, Famiglietti grew up in a village near Naples, Italy. She entered the House of St. Bridget in Rome at 13. She was the order's Superior General from 1981 to 2016 and thus built up the order during more than three decades.
 
Famiglietti encouraged wealthy and powerful benefactors of the order, such as Fidel Castro, Ronald Reagan, casino operator José María Guardia, and Francisco Franco. She oversaw a number of hotels, guesthouses and restaurants in several countries, including Israel, India, Cuba, the United States, and Italy.

Famiglietti was a traditionalist Catholic who expressed orthodox beliefs. In 2005 Pope John Paul II decided to establish a Peace Centre in Jerusalem and asked her to implement it. She had a close relationship with the Pope and was present at his death bed.

Famiglietti died on 3 March 2020.

Controversy
Controversy has arisen over the treatment of the Indian women who form a large percentage of the order. Most houses of the order support themselves by providing bed and breakfast hospitality to guests at standard industry rates. This became public in 2002 when six Indian sisters from different houses of the order in Italy fled to a Benedictine monastery, where they were given refuge by the abbot, who was subsequently deposed from office by the Holy See for this, a highly unusual act.

References

1936 births
2020 deaths
20th-century Italian Roman Catholic religious sisters and nuns
21st-century Italian Roman Catholic religious sisters and nuns
Bridgettine Religious Sisters
Italian traditionalist Catholics
People from the Province of Naples
Recipients of the Order of the Cross of Terra Mariana, 3rd Class